Kolding is a surname. People with the surname include:

 Eivind Kolding (born 1959), Danish businessman
 Jens Kolding (born 1952), Danish football player
 Lisbet Kolding (born 1965), Danish football player
 Mads Pieler Kolding (born 1988), Danish badminton player

See also
 Kolding (disambiguation)

Surnames of Danish origin